The Alliance for the Arts is a New York City organization which serves the cultural community through research and advocacy. Now in its 32nd year, the alliance publishes information on the art and cultural events in New York City as well as studies highlighting the importance of the arts to the economy and to education.

Alliance for the Arts believes:
  Cultural organizations need tools for advocacy, self-evaluation, marketing and management.
  The public needs access to cultural and educational offerings.
  The language of the Internet is key to connecting the public to cultural organizations.

In November 2008, The Alliance for the Arts relaunched the NYC Arts Network, which consists of NYC-ARTS.org, NYCkidsARTS.org and the Arts Research Center, a research database for quantitative information on arts and culture in New York City.

References

External links
 Alliance for the Arts 
 Ask About the Health of the Arts 
 Randall Bourscheidt on Huffington Post: Arts Community to Obama: Here's What We're Fighting For

Non-profit organizations based in New York City
Educational organizations based in the United States
Arts organizations based in New York City